Nathan Green (born 4 January 1992) is an Australian professional rugby league footballer who last played for the Manly Warringah Sea Eagles in the National Rugby League.

Background
Born in Sydney, New South Wales, Green played his junior football for Renown United, before being signed by the St. George Illawarra Dragons.

Playing career

Early career
From 2010 to 2012, Green played for the St. George Illawarra Dragons' NYC team.

2012
In round 2 of the 2012 NRL season, Green made his NRL debut for St. George Illawarra against the Canterbury-Bankstown Bulldogs. In March, he re-signed with the St. George on a two-year contract. On 21 August, he was named at centre in the 2012 NYC Team of the Year. On 23 September, he was listed as one of the top ten upcoming youngsters in the NRL in Lifestyle Uncut Magazine.

2014
On 27 October, Green re-signed with St. George on a one-year contract.

2015
On 3 May, Green played for the New South Wales Residents against the Queensland Residents. On 18 August, he signed a one-year contract with the Manly Warringah Sea Eagles starting in 2016.

2016
At Manly, Green played the first two games of the 2016 NRL season. He would spend the next three months in the reserves before some good performances in the second row saw him earn a recall for Manly's round 16 match against the reigning premiers North Queensland. Green played well in a hard fought 30–26 loss in Townsville and retained his spot in the Manly back row for their round 17 match against St. George Illawarra at Brookvale Oval. Green scored his first try for Manly (and the opening try of the game) as the Sea Eagles snapped a 7 game losing streak with a comprehensive 36–6 win.

Green was released by Manly at the conclusion of the 2016 NRL season.

References

External links
NRL profile
2015 St. George Illawarra Dragons profile

1992 births
Living people
Australian rugby league players
Illawarra Cutters players
Manly Warringah Sea Eagles players
Rugby league centres
Rugby league players from Sydney
Rugby league second-rows
Rugby league wingers
St. George Illawarra Dragons players